Turf Skatepark, also known as "Surfin' Turf" or "The Turf", is a former skatepark located in Greenfield, Wisconsin, United States, less than one mile south of the city of Milwaukee. The Turf was an indoor/outdoor facility consisting of five sculptured concrete pools providing some of the best terrain of its time.

Concrete pools
The Turf included five sculptured concrete pools:
 The Lip Slide Gully:  pool, with a gradual  entry to a shallow pool
 The Footie Bowl: ,  pool with a comma-shaped roll-in, the transition was similar to most mini ramps
 The Triple Pool (aka The Clover): 3 connecting bowls (one 4 feet deep and two 8 feet deep) with concrete coping and ceramic tile
 The Key Hole Pool: 10 feet deep,  diameter with concrete coping and ceramic tile
 The Half Pipe Capsule: 11 to 13 feet deep with 1 to 3 feet of vertical

History
Designed by legendary Skatepark designer, California Architect Art Kent (aka Footie) in 1979 through the Foxfire Skatepark Development Group. Art is the original designer of the Three Leaf Clover and Side Entry Capsule Bowl in 1970's. The Park was Originally opened by Jerry Steuernagel in 1979 as Surfin' Turf near Interstate 894 and West Loomis Road, his unique indoor skatepark designed by Kent consisted of in-ground concrete pools for riding skateboards. The overhead warehouse side doors were open in the summertime and closed during inclement weather to allow for all year round skateboarding.  The park had a unique mix of beginner, intermediate and advanced year round skate elements.  As skateboarding lost popularity, it closed in 1982 and the building was repurposed as a strip club called Bell E. Buttons, though the pools remained intact under the floor.

In 1987, the original owners of the skatepark were able to reacquire the building and reopen it for skateboarding as The Turf. At that time, it was one of only a handful of skateparks left in the U.S., and the only indoor skatepark in the country. It attracted professional and amateur skateboarders from around the world.

In 1995, skating any kind of transition was considered "uncool" and people and magazines alike thought Vert skating was in its death throes. This prompted the owners to fill the bowls with gravel, take off the pool coping that was on the Clover and the Keyhole bowls and cover the entire indoor portion of the park with concrete, and built a street course, hoping to make the park profitable once again. Unfortunately, this did not work and in 1996 the Turf closed for good. The building then housed a cabinet company and a lawn and garden shop for nearly 15 years.

In 2010, the Wisconsin Department of Transportation acquired the property for use as a staging area during the construction of a new freeway ramp.  It did not destroy the concrete bowls, however, which remained filled with gravel.  In 2010, local skaters tried to dig out the bowls.

In 2019, the Wisconsin Department of Transportation sold the site of Turf to the City of Greenfield for $1.  The city hopes to revive the skate park.

On February 19, 2020 The Turf Skatepark Association and Grindline (a skatepark design company) hosted a design workshop to get community input aimed at rebuilding and reopening The Turf. Currently, the plan is to investigate restoring some of the original park as well as adding new features that will cater to all types of skaters.

Turf membership
In 2010, former owner Jerry Steuernagel described the skatepark at its peak: "We had 10,000 members from all over the world. Every kid was a member. That's how I sold it."

Notable Turf members

References

Buildings and structures in Milwaukee
Skateparks in the United States
Buildings and structures completed in 1979
1987 establishments in Wisconsin